Jean Sarrazin (born 5 February 1934) is a French equestrian. He competed in two events at the 1968 Summer Olympics.

References

1934 births
Living people
French male equestrians
Olympic equestrians of France
Equestrians at the 1968 Summer Olympics
20th-century French people